This is a list of seasons completed by the Lake Superior State University Lakers men's ice hockey team. 

Lake Superior State has won three NCAA Championships and two NAIA Championships in its history.

* Winning percentage is used when conference schedules are unbalanced.
† Bill Selman Resigned in December of 1982.

Footnotes

References

 
Lists of college men's ice hockey seasons in the United States
Lake Superior State Lakers ice hockey seasons